Ingrid Van Keilegom (born 24 December 1971 in Antwerp) is a Belgian statistician. She is a professor of operations research and business statistics at KU Leuven, and an extraordinary professor at the Université catholique de Louvain. Her research interests include survival analysis, observational error, econometrics, and nonparametric statistics.

Education and career
Van Keilegom earned a licentiate in mathematical sciences from Universitaire Instelling Antwerpen in 1993, a master's degree in biostatistics from Limburgs Universitair Centrum in 1996, and a doctorate in statistics from Limburgs Universitair Centrum in 1998. Her dissertation, Nonparametric estimation of the conditional distribution in regression with censored data, was supervised by Noël Veraverbeke.

After working as an assistant professor at Pennsylvania State University and Eindhoven University of Technology, she returned to Belgium in 2000 with a position at the Université catholique de Louvain. In 2016 she switched her full professorship there to a part-time position, to take another professorship at KU Leuven.

Recognition
Van Keilegom was named a Fellow of the Institute of Mathematical Statistics in 2008 "for contributions to statistical theory and methodology, especially semi- and nonparametric regression, survival analysis, and empirical likelihood methods." She has also been a Fellow of the American Statistical Association since 2013.

References

External links
Home page

1971 births
Living people
Belgian statisticians
Women statisticians
University of Antwerp alumni
Academic staff of KU Leuven
Fellows of the Institute of Mathematical Statistics
Pennsylvania State University faculty
Academic staff of the Eindhoven University of Technology
Academic staff of the Université catholique de Louvain